Baba Mohammad Sanjabi (also Romanized as Bābā Moḩammad Sanjābī; also known as Bābā Moḩammad) is a village in Nurali Rural District, in the Central District of Delfan County, Lorestan Province, Iran. At the 2006 census, its population was 201, in 42 families.

References 

Towns and villages in Delfan County